Guido Joel Knudson (born August 5, 1989) is an American former professional baseball pitcher. He has played in Major League Baseball (MLB) for the Detroit Tigers.

Early life
Prior to playing professionally, Knudson attended Bonita Vista High School and then the University of California, San Diego. During his tenure at the university, he pitched for the North Adams SteepleCats of the New England Collegiate Baseball League and he also played for the Woodstock River Bandits of the Valley Baseball League, earning an All-Star selection in 2009. He earned All-West and All-CCAA honors in 2011.

Career

Detroit Tigers
The Detroit Tigers selected Knudson in the 28th round of the 2011 Major League Baseball Draft and he pitched for the GCL Tigers and Connecticut Tigers that year, posting a 3.42 ERA in 18 games. In 2012, he had a 3.86 ERA in 16 games between the Lakeland Flying Tigers and West Michigan Whitecaps and in 2013, he had a 1.79 ERA in 42 games for the Whitecaps. Between Lakeland and the Erie SeaWolves in 2014, he had a 3.99 ERA with seven saves in 40 appearances. One observer noted he has a "slider that is about MLB average" and that he "may cut out an MLB career for himself."

On August 20, 2015, the Tigers purchased the contract of Knudson from the Toledo Mud Hens after placing starters Aníbal Sánchez and Daniel Norris on the disabled list. Prior to being called up by the Tigers, Knudson had a 1–2 record and a 2.52 ERA in 30 appearances with the Mud Hens, allowing 27 hits over 39 innings, with 21 walks and 40 strikeouts. Knudson made his major league debut on August 22, in a game against the Texas Rangers. In his debut, he pitched one inning, allowing one hit, a home run to Rougned Odor, with two strikeouts and no walks. Knudson became the first pitcher since at least 1914 to give up a home run in each of his first four Major League relief appearances.

Pittsburgh Pirates
On November 9, 2015, Knudson was claimed off waivers by the Pittsburgh Pirates. He was released in January 2016, but was re-signed the same month. He was released again on June 17.

Seattle Mariners
On July 3, 2016, Knudson signed a minor league deal with the Seattle Mariners. He elected free agency on October 6, 2016.

Knudson retired from professional baseball in April 2017.

References

External links

1989 births
Baseball players from California
Connecticut Tigers players
Detroit Tigers players
Erie SeaWolves players
Gulf Coast Tigers players
Lakeland Flying Tigers players
Living people
Major League Baseball pitchers
Sportspeople from San Diego County, California
Toledo Mud Hens players
UC San Diego Tritons baseball players
West Michigan Whitecaps players
Indianapolis Indians players
Tacoma Rainiers players
Jackson Generals (Southern League) players
People from Bonita, California